Kai Trewin (born 18 May 2001) is an Australian professional soccer player who plays as a defender for Brisbane Roar.

Club career

Brisbane Roar
On 6 March 2020, Trewin made his professional debut in a Round 22 clash against Western Sydney Wanderers, replacing Scott McDonald in the 92nd minute as the Roar won 3-1.

International career
Trewin has represented Australia at various youth levels.

Honours

Club
Brisbane Roar
Y-League: 2018–19

International
Australia U20
AFF U-19 Youth Championship: 2019

Australia U17
AFF U-16 Youth Championship: 2016

References

External links

2001 births
Living people
Australian soccer players
Association football defenders
Brisbane Roar FC players
National Premier Leagues players
A-League Men players
Sportsmen from New South Wales
Soccer players from New South Wales